Low Isles is a locality in the Shire of Douglas, Queensland, Australia.

Geography 
The locality consists of a pair of islands: the smaller Low Island and the larger Woody Island with the Low Islands Reef between them.

History 
The name comes from Lieutenant James Cook of HMS Endeavour, who wrote in his log on 10 June 1770, "...we hauld off north to get without a small, low island...". In 1954, a scientific expedition to Low Isles to monitor water quality was organised by the Geology Department, University of Queensland and led by Dr Fred Whitehouse.

Attractions 
The islands are popular for snorkelling over the reef to see coral, fish and sea turtles. Birdwatching is popular on Woody Island where white heron and migrating species are seen. Low Island has the Low Isles Lighthouse and a museum.

References 

Shire of Douglas
Localities in Queensland